Lagi Dyer (born 16 April 1972) is a Fijian former international footballer who played as a striker.

Career
Dyer played club football for Rewa.

He made his international debut for Fiji in 2004, and appeared in FIFA World Cup qualifying matches.

References

1972 births
Living people
Fijian footballers
Fiji international footballers
Rewa F.C. players
Association football forwards
2004 OFC Nations Cup players
2008 OFC Nations Cup players